Capelense Sport Clube  (known as Capelense SC or Capelense), is a Portuguese football club based in Capelas on the island of São Miguel in the Azores.

Background
Capelense SC currently plays in the AF Ponta Delgada 1ª Divisão (known as the Campeonato de S. Miguel) which is the fifth tier of Portuguese football. The club was founded in 1922 and they currently play their home matches at the Campo Municipal Jâcome Correia in Ponta Delgada. The stadium is able to accommodate 1,500 spectators. The club's home ground on the seafront at Capelas is under development, the layout of the stadium having been re-positioned leaving part of the existing structure in a derelict condition.

The club is affiliated to Associação de Futebol de Ponta Delgada and has competed in the AF Ponta Delgada Taça. The club has also entered the national cup competition known as Taça de Portugal on a few occasions.

Season to season

Honours
AF Ponta Delgada 1ª Divisão - Campeonato de S. Miguel: 2003–04, 2006–07

References

Football clubs in Portugal
Football clubs in the Azores
Association football clubs established in 1922
1922 establishments in Portugal
Football clubs in São Miguel Island